Makwayera is an African style of choral singing that native Zimbabweans developed by combining elements of their traditional vocal music with the western four-part harmony brought to the region by missionaries. It includes elements of call and response and a strong vocal leader.  The most famous singer of this style of music is the LPP.

Vocal music
Zimbabwean music